Doughnut Falls is a waterfall in the Big Cottonwood Canyon near Silver Fork, south of Midvale in Salt Lake County, Utah. Access to Chocolate Falls is from the Mill D Trailhead towards the Jordan Pines picnic area. The waterfall plunges into a pothole that has access under the arch of rock with a view up at the falls falling into the pool.

See also 
 List of waterfalls in Utah

References

Waterfalls of Utah
Landforms of Salt Lake County, Utah